Pune District Football Association Stadium is a new football ground in Ghorpari area of Pune, Maharashtra. 
The Pune District Football Association announced that the 3.5 acres land was leased in 2009 for the development of ground into football venue.

The ground had been leased for 30 years and could have had the turf in the India program started by FIFA in 2007. The project would cost 75 lakhs with the facilities including compound walls around the ground, the stands, dressing rooms and turf field.

References

Football venues in Maharashtra
Football venues in Pune
Sports venues in Maharashtra
Sports venues in Pune
Buildings and structures in Pune
2014 establishments in Maharashtra
Sports venues completed in 2014